James Joseph Larranaga Jr. (born January 30, 1975) is an American professional basketball coach and former player who currently serves on the staff of the Los Angeles Clippers. His was previously the top assistant coach for the Boston Celtics of the National Basketball Association (NBA). He is also the son of University of Miami men's basketball coach Jim Larrañaga.

Career
After graduating from St. John's Jesuit High School and Academy, Larranaga played college basketball for the Bowling Green Falcons alongside Antonio Daniels. Here he played all four years for his father, Jim, setting BGSU records for three-point field goals in a game, season, and career. Before his departure to Italy in 1997, Larranaga became a three-time Academic All-Mac and attained a cumulative 3.4 GPA studying business at Bowling Green State University.

Larranaga joined Peristeri B.C. in Greece for the 1998-99 season. Larranaga then moved to France to play for ASVEL Villeurbanne, he also played in and won the 2000 French All-Star game. Larranaga moved back to Italy in November 2000 to join Pallacanestro Olimpia Milano however he moved back to France to play for the Paris Basket Racing.

Larranaga then moved to Spain to play for CB Gran Canaria and CSF Sevilla. He then moved back to Italy to join Pallacanestro Virtus Roma and his former club Viola Reggio Calabria. He went back to Spain in 2004 to join Real Madrid Baloncesto where he won the Spanish National Championship. He then won the Italian National Cup with Basket Napoli in 2006 and 2008. Larranaga retired after spending two seasons in Eldo Caserta and appearing in various All-Star games throughout his lengthy career.

In 2008 Larranaga was announced as player/manager of the Ireland team. Previous to the hiring, he was captain of the Irish national team from 2001-2006.

Coaching career
Larranaga entered his first season as an assistant coach with the Boston Celtics in 2012. He spent the previous two seasons as head coach of the Erie BayHawks of the NBA Development League. In two seasons with the BayHawks, Larranaga led his squad to consecutive playoff appearances while accumulating a regular-season record of 60–40. He also established team records for all-time wins (60), wins in a season (32), and player call-ups (12). During Larranaga's two years in Erie, eight different players received NBA call-ups. Prior to arriving in Erie, Larranaga served as an assistant coach at Cornell University in Ithaca, New York, and before that, he was head coach of the Irish National Team for two years. Larranaga spent the summer of 2012 as an assistant for the Ukraine National Team under former NBA coach Mike Fratello.

In 2013, Larranaga was interviewed by the Celtics to possibly replace Doc Rivers, but Butler basketball head coach Brad Stevens became the Celtics' new head coach. In the previous 3 seasons, Larranaga and the coaching staff led the Celtics to the Eastern Conference Playoffs including a trip to the Eastern Conference Finals in the 2016-2017 season.

Larranaga was a top candidate to fill the head coaching positions at Georgia Tech and George Mason University, but decided to stay in his position with the Boston Celtics.

In July 2021, Larranaga was hired as an assistant coach under Tyronn Lue with the Los Angeles Clippers.

Honors

France

All-Star
All-Star game winner: 2000

Italy

Basket Napoli
Italian Basketball Cup winner: 2006

Spain

Real Madrid
Liga ACB winner: 2005
Copa del Rey de Baloncesto runner-up: 2005

Personal life
Larranaga and his wife, Sarah, married in 2017. He has two children, daughter Tia and son James, from a previous marriage.

See also
 Basketball Ireland
 List of foreign NBA coaches

References

1975 births
Living people
American expatriate basketball people in France
American expatriate basketball people in Greece
American expatriate basketball people in Italy
American expatriate basketball people in Spain
American men's basketball players
ASVEL Basket players
Basket Napoli players
Boston Celtics assistant coaches
Bowling Green Falcons men's basketball players
CB Gran Canaria players
Real Betis Baloncesto players
Erie BayHawks (2008–2017) coaches
Ireland men's national basketball team players
Irish expatriate basketball people in France
Irish expatriate basketball people in Greece
Irish expatriate basketball people in Italy
Irish expatriate basketball people in Spain
Irish basketball coaches
Irish men's basketball players
Juvecaserta Basket players
Liga ACB players
Olimpia Milano players
Pallacanestro Virtus Roma players
Paris Racing Basket players
Peristeri B.C. players
Real Madrid Baloncesto players
Sportspeople from the Bronx
Basketball players from New York City
Viola Reggio Calabria players
Shooting guards